This is a List of All Saints characters featuring all the main/permanent character, as well as the actors that portrayed them and a brief character synopsis, relating to the Australian medical drama All Saints.

Main cast

References

Lists of Australian television series characters
Lists of drama television characters
Characters